Monroe Edward Palmer, Baron Palmer of Child's Hill,  (born 30 November 1938) is a British Liberal Democrat politician and life peer in the House of Lords.

Born on 30 November 1938, Palmer was Liberal Party treasurer between 1971 and 1983. He was appointed an Officer of the Order of the British Empire (OBE) in the 1982 New Year Honours. He contested the Hendon South constituency at the 1979, 1983 and 1987 general elections for the Liberal party, and was joint treasurer of the Liberal parliamentary party from 1977 to 1983. Following the creation of the Liberal Democrats he contested Hastings and Rye at the 1992 and 1997 general elections. 

Palmer first stood as a candidate for Barnet London Borough Council in Childs Hill ward in 1968, first elected 1986, stood down in 1994, returned 1998 and finally retired in 2014. He was chair of its audit committee of a council with a £500 million net annual expenditure. On 19 November 2010, it was announced that Palmer would be created a life peer. He was created Baron Palmer of Childs Hill, of Childs Hill in the London Borough of Barnet on 17 January 2011

Monroe Palmer is a Chartered Accountant and a former senior partner in general practice.

In the House of Lords, Palmer spoke, until May 2014, on defence (procurement, housing, veterans) and now speaks on international affairs, local government, taxation, fire and safety, and all matters relating to trade and business. He has a long-standing interest in achieving peace in the Middle East and is a regular speaker on this and  also on matters of concern to the UK Jewish Community. Palmer is a Vice President of the Jewish Leadership Council.

He is married to Susette, who was a councillor for Childs Hill from 1994 to 2014. They have three children and seven grandchildren including "up and coming rap artist" Dave in Charge.

References

1938 births
Living people
Liberal Democrats (UK) life peers
English Jews
English accountants
Liberal Democrats (UK) councillors
Councillors in the London Borough of Barnet
Officers of the Order of the British Empire
Liberal Democrats (UK) parliamentary candidates
Jewish British politicians
Liberal Party (UK) parliamentary candidates
Life peers created by Elizabeth II